Outlier is the second studio album by the Australian alternative metal band Twelve Foot Ninja. It was released on 26 August 2016 and contains ten tracks, with one bonus track. The album entered the ARIA Albums Chart at #6 during its first week of release.

Critical reception

Outlier received critical acclaim on release. Carl Neumann of Heavy magazine called the album "superb" and wrote. "Twelve Foot Ninja are truly masters of incorporating elements into heavy music that would otherwise just sound ridiculous, and Outlier is a shining example of heavy metal fusion done right."

Track listing

Personnel
 Kin Etik – lead vocals
 Steve "Stevic" MacKay – lead guitar
 Rohan Hayes – rhythm guitar, backing vocals
 Damon McKinnon – bass
 Shane "Russ" Russell – drums

Additional musicians:
 Ben Grayson - keyboards on tracks 1 & 7
 Dorian West - horns on track 7
 Sam Evans - tablas on track 8
 Lana Rita Sayah - backing vocals on track 3
 Sachi MacKay - experimental vocals on track 10
 Mr. Bill - IDM production on track 8
 Remi Gallego - matrix production on track 2
 Keith Draws - art direction, illustration
 Reuben Bhattacharya - graphic design, album layout

Charts

References

2016 albums
Twelve Foot Ninja albums